The 1963 Australian federal election was held in Australia on 30 November 1963. All 122 seats in the House of Representatives were up for election. The incumbent Liberal–Country coalition government, led by Prime Minister Sir Robert Menzies, won an increased majority over the opposition Labor Party, led by Arthur Calwell. This was the only time that a Federal Government won a seventh consecutive term in office.

Background

The election was held following the early dissolution of the House of Representatives.  The Prime Minister of Australia, Sir Robert Menzies, gave as his reason for calling an election within two years that there was an insufficient working majority in the House. The 1961 election had been won with a substantially reduced majority of only two seats.  One of the consequences of an early House election was that there were separate Senate and House elections until 1974.  This became a factor in the Gair Affair.

The Coalition government of the Liberal Party led by Sir Robert Menzies and the Country Party led by John McEwen was returned with a substantially increased majority over the Australian Labor Party led by Arthur Calwell.

Indigenous Australians could vote in federal elections on the same basis as other electors for the first time in this election following an amendment to the Commonwealth Electoral Act becoming law on 1 November. The amendment enfranchised Indigenous people in Western Australia, Queensland and the Northern Territory. Indigenous voting rights in other states had been in place since 1949.

Issues

State aid for non-government schools 

The election was notable for the issue of state aid to non-government schools being finally resolved.  There was a school strike in Goulburn, New South Wales in 1962. Health officials had requested the installation of three extra toilets at a Catholic primary school. The Catholic Church declared it had no money to install the extra toilets. The archdiocese closed down its schools and sent the children to government schools.  Nearly 1,000 children turned up to be enrolled locally and the state schools were unable to accommodate them. The strike received national attention.  The Labor premier of New South Wales, Robert Heffron, had promised money for science labs at non-government schools.  This policy was overturned by a meeting of the Labor Party's federal executive.  Under ALP rules the federal executive had responsibility for party policy when the party's national conference was out of session.  Menzies called a snap election with state aid for science blocks and Commonwealth scholarships for students at both government and non-government schools as part of his party's platform.  This tended to woo Catholic voters away from the Labor Party which they traditionally supported; the wedge driven between the ALP and its Catholic constituency took nearly a decade to overcome.  Most non-government schools were Catholic.  The Labor Party suffered a first-preference swing of −2.43% and the loss of ten seats.  The Country Party vote was higher than the Democratic Labor Party (DLP) vote for the first time since 1955; the DLP had evolved from the Catholic wing of the ALP. The Liberal Party was, however, not dependent on the state-aid issue to win the election; other issues, such as the "36 faceless men" gibe, also did damage to the ALP.

North-west Cape communications facility 

Other key issues in the election included the proposal by the United States to build the North-west Cape communications facility which would support the US nuclear submarine capability. A special federal conference of the ALP was called in March 1963 which, by a narrow margin, supported the base.  The Left faction was opposed to a foreign base on Australian soil, especially one which supported America's nuclear weapons capability.

"36 faceless men" 
During the ALP Federal Conference in March 1963, journalist Alan Reid commissioned a photograph of Arthur Calwell and Gough Whitlam standing outside the conference venue at Kingston, a suburb of Canberra.  Although Calwell was the Leader of the Opposition in the House of Representatives and Whitlam was his deputy, neither man was eligible to attend the conference, which consisted of six members elected by each state ALP branch.  Reid jibed that the ALP was ruled by "36 faceless men" – an accusation that was picked up by Menzies and the Liberal Party in its election propaganda, and is still remembered more than 40 years later.

Assassination of US President Kennedy 
The week before the election, on 22 November 1963, John F. Kennedy, the President of the United States, was assassinated.  Alister McMullin, President of the Senate, represented Australia at the funeral in Washington. It has been suggested that this tragedy helped to consolidate Menzies' position.

Results

See 1961 Australian federal election and 1964 Australian Senate election for Senate compositions.

Seats changing hands

See also
 Candidates of the Australian federal election, 1963
 Members of the Australian House of Representatives, 1963–1966

Notes

References
University of WA  election results in Australia since 1890
AEC 2PP vote
Prior to 1984 the AEC did not undertake a full distribution of preferences for statistical purposes. The stored ballot papers for the 1983 election were put through this process prior to their destruction. Therefore, the figures from 1983 onwards show the actual result based on full distribution of preferences.

Australian federal election, 1963
federal
Australia